

Women's 50m Backstroke - Final

Women's 50m Backstroke - Semifinals

Women's 50m Backstroke - Semifinal 01

Women's 50m Backstroke - Semifinal 02

Women's 50m Backstroke - Heats

Women's 50m Backstroke - Heat 01

Women's 50m Backstroke - Heat 02

Women's 50m Backstroke - Heat 03

Women's 50m Backstroke - Heat 04

50 metres backstroke
2006 in women's swimming